Tubize 2069 is a preserved Belgian industrial steam locomotive built by Ateliers de Tubize. The wheel notation is 0-6-0T. The locomotive has been named "HELENA".

At least 15 locomotives of this type were built. Three were built for the National Local Railways Company (Dutch: Nationale Maatschappij van de Buurtspoorwegen). At least three (but no more than six) were built for Métallurgie Hoboken Overpelt factory. Loco No 2069 was one of them.

Tubize 2069 was used by Métallurgie Hoboken Overpelt until the 1970s. Later it came to the SDP heritage railway (in Dendermonde). It has been restored now and is operational during the summer of 2010.

References

External links 
 Pictures
 SDP heritage

Preserved steam locomotives of Belgium
0-6-0T locomotives
Dendermonde
Standard gauge locomotives of Belgium